"Quest" is a science fiction novelette by American writer Poul Anderson, about the consequences of an extraterrestrial scoutship landing in Medieval England. It is a sequel to Anderson's 1960 novel The High Crusade. Poul Anderson described the original as "one of the most popular things I've ever done, going through many book editions in several languages." "Quest", originally appeared in Ares magazine in the same issue that saw the original publication of The High Crusade wargame. The novelette was included in two collections of Anderson's short work, Space Folk and Going for Infinity, before being added to the Baen Books fiftieth anniversary edition of The High Crusade.

Plot summary

In 1375, in the English capital of Troynovaunt (on the conquered Wersgor planet), King Roger is recruiting a military force to seek out the Holy Grail. King Roger formulates a plan that with the mustered ship, which they come to call the Bonaventura, he can take the small army to the planet where the Holy Grail is held. The small army, with all of their belongings, board the ship at the king's instruction, and prepare to take off.

Characters

King Roger: Roger, the king of England is fictional. He was known as Baron de Tourneville in The High Crusade. His wife is Lady Catherine.
Lady Catherine
Brother Parvus, the narrator of Quest
Sir Owain Montbelle
Red John Hameward, a soldier under king Roger
Sir Brian Fitz-William, a knight under king Roger
Alfred Edgarson, a soldier under king Roger
Thomas Bullard, a soldier under king Roger
Branithar
Chief ("Grath") Huruga
Hubert the executioner
Tertiary Eggmaster of the Northwest Hive, aka "Ethelbert"

References

External links
Quest in Ares

1983 American novels
American science fiction novels
Novellas by Poul Anderson
Novels set in the Middle Ages
1983 science fiction novels
Novels set in the 14th century
Alternate history short stories